Nélson Alexandre Gomes Pereira, known simply as Nélson (born 20 October 1975), is a Portuguese retired footballer who played as a goalkeeper.

Club career
Nélson was born in Torres Vedras, Lisbon. He started his football career with hometown club S.C.U. Torreense, and was primarily used as a backup at Sporting CP, first to Peter Schmeichel then to Ricardo, for nearly a decade. His best output for the Lions came in the 2002–03 season, between Schmeichel's departure from the Estádio José Alvalade and Ricardo's arrival, playing 19 Primeira Liga matches in an eventual third-place finish, 27 points behind champions FC Porto.

After 2005–06, Nélson moved to Vitória FC, but due to unpaid wages – a recurring problem in the club for the past seasons prior to his arrival – he left the sadinos, being out of work for almost six months before joining another Lisbon side, C.F. Estrela da Amadora, in July 2007.

Estrela would be relegated at the end of the 2008–09 campaign after continuing financial problems, even though it finished in mid-table, and Nélson subsequently moved to neighbours C.F. Os Belenenses. He suffered an injury in training in December 2009, and never played again as the Estádio do Restelo side finished second from bottom and dropped down a division; aged nearly 35, he chose to retire, but returned to his main club Sporting the following year as goalkeeping coach.

International career
Nélson was capped three times for Portugal, all in 2002, making his debut on 27 March in a 1–4 friendly loss to Finland in Porto; he came on as a half-time substitute and conceded the last goal. After Quim was sent home for failing a drugs test, he was picked as third-choice for that year's FIFA World Cup.

Honours
Sporting
Primeira Liga: 1999–2000, 2001–02
Taça de Portugal: 2001–02

References

External links

1975 births
Living people
People from Torres Vedras
Portuguese footballers
Association football goalkeepers
Primeira Liga players
Liga Portugal 2 players
Segunda Divisão players
S.C.U. Torreense players
Sporting CP footballers
Sporting CP B players
Vitória F.C. players
C.F. Estrela da Amadora players
C.F. Os Belenenses players
Portugal international footballers
2002 FIFA World Cup players
Sportspeople from Lisbon District